Amos Ori (born 1956) is a professor of Physics at the Technion – Israel Institute of Technology in Haifa, Israel. He received media attention in 2005 when he proposed, in a letter to Physical Review Letters, what he claimed was a more "realistic" model for time travel.

See also
Wormhole

References

External links
Science News discusses Ori's wormhole theory
Could Physicists Make A Time Machine? It All Depends On Curving Space-Time
New  Model Eliminates Barriers To Time Travel
Time Travel Machine Outlined

Living people
Israeli physicists
Academic staff of Technion – Israel Institute of Technology
1956 births
Jewish physicists